Nicole C. Mullen the musician
Nicole Mullen, the sister of Jess Murphy in "Secrets and Lies"